The  Little League World Series took place between August 24 and August 28 in Williamsport, Pennsylvania. The Chofu Little League of Tokyo, Japan, defeated the Campbell Little League of Campbell, California, in the championship game of the 30th Little League World Series.

This was the first LLWS to put the International and U.S. teams on different sides of the bracket.

Teams

Winners bracket

The consolation game between Puerto Nuevo, Puerto Rico, and Richmond, Virginia, was cancelled due to inclement weather; both teams shared third place.

Consolation Bracket

Notable players
 Ray Ferraro of the Trail, British Columbia, team went on to play in the NHL as a center from 1984 to 2002.

External links
1976 Little League World Series
Line scores for the 1976 LLWS

Little League World Series
Little League World Series
Little League World Series